The Sierrita Mine is a large copper mine located in the  Sierrita Mountains of Arizona, in the southwestern part of the United States. The mine is located in southern Pima County, southwest of Tucson and west of Green Valley-Sahuarita.

Originally developed as an underground mine in 1907, the Sierrita open pit has been in operation since 1959 and is a copper and molybdenum mining complex, operating on a porphyry copper deposit with oxide, secondary sulfide, and primary sulfide mineralization. The mine produces copper and molybdenum concentrate as well as SX/EW copper cathode from a ROM oxide-leaching system.

Sierrita was operated by Cyprus Mines (later Cyprus Amax Minerals) from 1986 to 1999. Sierrita was operated by Phelps Dodge from 1999 until 2007 when it was acquired by Freeport-McMoRan. The mine has one of the largest copper reserves in the United States and in the world. In 2018, the deposit had estimated proven and probable reserves of 3,369 million tonnes of ore grading 0.23% copper and 0.02% molybdenum along with an additional resource of 1,378 million tonnes of mineralized material at 0.17% copper and 0.02% molybdenum.

References

External links
 

Copper mines in Arizona
Geography of Pima County, Arizona
Freeport-McMoRan mines